Gateway Church (formerly St Mark's Church) in Woodhouse, Leeds, West Yorkshire, England is an Evangelical church.  It was the Parish Church of St Mark, an Anglican church until its closure in 2005.  It reopened as Gateway Church in 2014.

History

Built as a Church of England Commissioners' Church between 1823 and 1826 by Peter Atkinson Junior and RH Sharp.  Alterations were made to the window tracery and tower in 1873 by RL Adams and J Kelly.  St Mark's was one of three Commissioner churches built in Leeds, it is the only one to survive.  The church was made redundant in 2005.  Since closure it fell into a state of relative disrepair.  It was renovated by Gateway Church in 2014 and is used for functions including exams for the University of Leeds.

Use in television
The church was used as the 'Parish Church of St Matthew' in The Beiderbecke Affair.  The interior shots including the crypt which featured heavily were filmed however in St Peter's Church in Stanley (demolished 2014).

Architectural style

Exterior
The church is built of coursed squared stone and ashlar with a pitched slate roof.  The church has a west tower made up of three stages.  The church has a six-bay nave and chancel.  The tower has a west door, two-light belfry windows and three-light windows to its second stage.  It is topped by octagonal pinnacles.

Interior
The church has a single continuous nave and chancel with a vestry and oak-cased organ at the east end of the north aisle and a side chapel at the east end of the south aisle.  There is a reredos of carved stone.  There is a painted octagonal stone font and an octagonal pulpit with traceried panels installed as a memorial to the Reverend JS Abbott in 1891.  A mezzanine level has been added since the churches renovation dividing the windows.

Monuments and memorials
The churchyard has the headstone of the architectural sculptor Charles Mawer, whose sculptures can be found in many churches throughout the former West Riding. The monument was Grade II listed in 1997, however since then an urn and two angels have been removed from the monument.

On the north wall of the nave a crocketed arch has a plaque carved with ivy leaves commemorating William Schofield (d. 1857), John Coultate (d. 1864), Hannah (d.1860) and Alice (d. 1863) Craven.

There is a monument to the east end of the north aisle inside the vestry dedicated to Susannah Blesard (d. 1856). Since the renovation most of the monument is concealed behind shelving. The monument was carved by Catherine Mawer and is now in a worn condition.

See also
List of places of worship in the City of Leeds
Listed buildings in Leeds (Hyde Park and Woodhouse)

References

External links

Gateway Church, Leeds
Church of St Mark (British Listed Buildings)

Churches in Leeds
Grade II listed churches in Leeds
Evangelical churches in the United Kingdom
Grade II listed churches in West Yorkshire
Church of England church buildings in West Yorkshire
Anglican Diocese of Leeds
Diocese of Wakefield
Anglo-Catholic church buildings in West Yorkshire
Gothic Revival architecture in Leeds